Cordis is a company that develops and manufactures medical devices for diagnostics and interventional procedures to treat patients with coronary and peripheral vascular diseases.

Cordis was founded in 1959 in Miami, Florida, and currently operates in North America, Europe, the Middle East, Africa, Asia-Pacific, and Latin America markets. The Cordis global headquarters are jointly located in Baar, Switzerland, and Santa Clara, California. The headquarters also acts as a hub for Cordis' operations in Europe, Africa, and the Middle East. The North American operations are based out of the San Francisco Bay area. The Asia-Pacific hub is located in Singapore, and the Latin American hub is in Puerto Rico.[1]

History 
The Medical Development Corporation was founded in 1957 in Miami, Florida, by Dr. William P. Murphy Jr. and focused on interventional vascular medicine and neuroscience. In 1959, the company's name changed to Cordis.

In 1970, Cordis introduced the first sheath introducers with hemostasis valves, designed to minimize blood loss during an angioplasty procedure. 

In 1996, Cordis joined the Johnson & Johnson Intervention Systems (JJIS) and a year later, Cordis Corporation expanded into electrophysiology after Johnson & Johnson acquired Biosense Inc. and merged it with Cordis. In 1998, Biosense Inc. merged with Webster Laboratories to form Biosense Webster, Inc.

In 2015, Cardinal Health acquired the Cordis business from Johnson & Johnson for $1.944 billion.

On March 31, 2017, Cardinal Health announced two new strategic agreements that enabled Cordis, Cardinal Health's interventional vascular business, to expand its cardiology product offering in China. 

In March 2021, Cardinal announced plans to sell Cordis to private equity firm Hellman & Friedman for $1 billion.

References

Johnson & Johnson subsidiaries
Medical technology companies of the United States
Companies based in Fremont, California